Christmas in Hungary is celebrated with traditions similar to those found in other Central European countries (See: Christmas worldwide) as well as customs unique to the region.

The Christmas and gift-giving season starts relatively early compared to other cultures, with the Santa-like figure, or Hungarian version of Saint Nicholas, Mikulás (or Szent Miklós) traditionally visiting the homes of Hungarian children on the night of 5 December, on the eve of Saint Nicholas Feast Day, 6 December.

Although the role of gift-giver on Christmas Day itself is assigned to the Christ Child, on the night before St. Nicholas Day Hungarian children traditionally place a boot on their windowsill waiting for Mikulás to come by and fill it with treats.

There is no Mrs. Mikulás in Hungary. In Hungary, Mikulás often comes with an assistant: a "Krampusz", a Devil, who comes to scare and punish bad behaving children. Although even those, who behaved badly just get a warning in form of raw potato or charcoal instead of candy, which good behaving child gets from the other assistant - Angel -  in the Czech Republic, Slovenia and Slovakia, Mikulás has another assistant, a good Angel, who gives out presents to good children. While in the Netherlands and Belgium, he is often joined by a black-faced man called Zwarte Piet.

To expatriate Hungarians and those non-natives of Hungarian lineage, the celebration is often referred to as "Hungarian Christmas".

In the traditional Nicholas-walk, on 6 December, St. Nicholas comes clothed in a bishop's attire, a long red coat and a red cap on his head, holding a shepherd's crook in one hand, and carrying a sack full of gifts on his back. He cannot be seen because he arrives in the middle of the night when good little children are already fast asleep, so you'd better not try to stay up so late, otherwise he won't give you any presents, only a birch stick (virgács).

Before 24 December, people decorate their houses and start to cook and bake. At Christmas, the family members come together and celebrate. On 24 December, people decorate the tree with ornaments and put the wrapped presents under it. On Christmas Eve, which is the day before Christmas Day, young children are waiting for the arrival of Jesus and especially for the presents. Gift-giving is done after the meal, and after singing carols around the tree.

On Holy Night, Hungarians listen to holiday songs such as "Silent Night" and sing or attend Christmas mass.
They also burn candles on the Advent wreath during the four weeks before Christmas.

Hungarian Christmas meal 
 Fish soup 
 Stuffed cabbage
 Fried fish and rice
 Meats, such as chicken and pork, but turkey can also be used
 Christmas Cake
 Bejgli with walnut or poppy seeds
 honeybread cookies (mézes kalács)

Hungarians also have szaloncukor, which is a typical Hungarian sweet often used to decorate the Christmas tree.

Hungarian Christmas drinks 
 Alcoholic drinks such as beer, wine and liqueur
 Pálinka (a Hungarian spirit)
 Soft drinks

See also

References

External links
 Christmas in Hungary
 Christmas Traditions in Hungary
 Hungary Christmas Traditions
 Christmas Cooking in Hungary

Hungary
Hungary
Christianity in Hungary